The FAI World Paramotor Slalom Championships are an international event in paramotor organized by the Fédération Aéronautique Internationale (FAI). The first championship was held in 2013 in Aspres-sur-Buëch.

Editions

Medalists

PL1

PF1

PF1F

PL2

PF2

PF1E

PF1 Racing Teams

PL1 Racing Teams

Teams

References

External links 
 Fédération Aéronautique Internationale

World championships in aerial sports
Aerobatic competitions